Viswema, is a Southern Angami  Naga village located 22 km south of Kohima, the capital of Nagaland, India. With a resident population of 7417, it is the second biggest village in the state and is part of the contiguous built-up of the Kohima Metropolitan Area that extends into the neighboring areas of Jakhama, Kigwema and Khuzama in the Southern Angami region, forming the second largest urban agglomerations in Nagaland. Its vast territory also lies across the inter-state boundary in Manipur where notable features including Mount Tempü (Iso) at 9822 feet (2994m) also the highest peak in Manipur, the thick forest of Kezol-tsa and a major portion of the Dzüko Valley is located.

It is considered to be one of the oldest Tenyimi village with most Chakhesang villages and also many other Angami villages pointing their origin towards Viswema.

Etymology
Traditionally referred to as Viswe–ra, a name given by its historical ancestor Keyho which loosely translates to as ‘A place of people with Virtue and Integrity’.

Viswema is also known as Ve-sr-wü–ra by the Chokri Chakhesangs and Shüna–mai by the Ememei Maos.

History

Early period 
The history of Viswema, according to oral history begins with the founding of Kipizwü, some two km west of the village by Viswe. Viswe was a descendant of Keyho, who migrated from East Asia crossing Burma, Manipur and finally settling in Viswema.

The ancestors lived there for several generations till the invasion of the Burmese-Karens, who were known to Viswe–miko as Kherenümi. The defeat inflicted on the Burmese invaders gave a sense of confidence and Viswe–mi became more assertive and grew in great numbers. They began to move out in search of suitable environment for permanent settlement. They therefore came down to the present site of the village.

In the past Viswema was known for making fine pottery ware. For any function and rituals earthen pots were purchased from Viswema by neighboring communities.

Pre-Modern era 
Invasion of the Manipuri armies
"It was said that the Manipuris could not subdue Viswema given its large size. The armies could only defeat the village on its third attempt.

Before the invasion began a Manipuri messenger was sent to Viswema with something tied in a piece of cloth. When the parcel reached Viswema and the cloth was unwrapped, they found out it was ash. So the entire village intellectuals gathered around to figure out what it meant until someone stood up and said “it means they will burn down our village to ashes.” And so the Viswemis agreed to this and sent the messenger back to Manipur with grinded Naga King Chilly tied in the same piece of cloth meaning “Attack us if you want to know what pain feels like.”

— Oral history

The Manipuris invaded Viswema twice, but could not succeed in subduing it. However, after the end of the Anglo-Naga War in 1879 the British occupied Kohima and setup a military post and built strong barricade around the station with armed police. But the garrison was besieged by Naga warriors. Meantime the British sought help from the Manipuri Raja. The Manipuri Raja Chandrakirti Singh led around a thousand of his army and rushed to Kohima and after a brief engagement with the Naga warriors lifted the sieged and saved the British.

The Manipuri Army went on a rampage and captured a Kohima boy and buried him alive in the heart of the town. They covered the grave with a huge stone on which the foot print of the Manipuri Raja was engraved. This stone was removed by the Naga Youth Movement leaders in 1956.

At the time of the Manipuri army withdrawal from Kohima, the Viswe–miko left their village and hid their food grains in trenches and waited for their return from Kohima. When the Manipuris arrived and finding none set the village ablaze and proceeded homewards. Viswema warriors then attacked them from the rear, throwing them in confusion and disorder. Many were killed and their arms looted, while the rest fled to their country.

Modern era 
 World War II

When the Japanese and INA soldiers entered Naga Hills in early April 1944, many of them stayed at the outskirt of the village. They dug trenches and built strong bunkers everywhere in the vicinity of the village. Since the Allies operation against Japanese occupation of Kohima, Viswema was continuously hit by explosive missiles which were fired by cannons from Kohima and later on from Kigwema as launching pads. Many people were killed and injured. On 10 June 1944, a message from the Allies sources was conveyed to the village elders telling them to evacuate their village. The village was evacuated the next day. Bombings on 14 June continued till the village which had more than 600 houses at that time was completely razed to the ground. The same evening the Japanese forces at Viswema retreated to the route by which they had entered Naga Hills two months back. Viswema was then taken over by the Allies.

 1965 Naga National Council General Convention
On 21 May 1965, NNC had its General Convention after a gap of nine years. Imkongmeren, Vice President of the Naga National Council presided. He observed,“The art of peace making is much more difficult than the science of war.” The two resolutions passed at the session were: reaffirmation of A. Z. Phizo as their leader and earnest wish that the Government and people of India recognise the right of the Nagas to self-determination so that the cherished hope and the deep search for permanent peace to live together as good friends, good neighbours, may be fruitful and fulfilled. At the session, Lungshim Shaiza announced the dissolution of the Democratic Party.

 2010 Mao Gate Incident

On 5 May 2010, Thuingaleng Muivah the present General Secretary of the NSCN-IM arrived at Viswema on his way to his home village of Somdal in the Ukhrul District of Manipur which was strongly opposed by the Manipur government. Muivah stayed overnight at Viswema which was nearby on the inter-state border. The next day thousands gathered at Mao Gate to protest against the Manipur State Government's decision to prevent the entry of Muivah into Manipur but however violence broke out between the civilians and security forces stationed at the Manipur–Nagaland border. On that fateful day, two students were killed in indiscriminate firing by security forces of Manipur. Scores were injured.

 2010 Indian Army helicopter crash
On 18 August 2010, an Aérospatiale SA 315B Lama crashed after takeoff at the slopes of Teyozwü Hill. All three army personnel on board were killed immediately on impact.

Clans 
The Viswe–mi people are divided into four clans. These clans are further divided into sub-clans known as ‘Sara-miko’ which are the ‘last names/family names’ that the people are identified with. They are, namely:

Kirhazou-mi 
The family names of the Kkrah-zwü-mi (also Kirhazou-mi) clan are:

Pavo-mi 
The Pavo-mi clan is divided into two sub-clans—Tepa and Tevo which forms the Pavo–mi (tePA and teVO). The family names are:

Rachü-mi 
The family names of the Rachü-mi clan are:

Yeri-mi 
Commonly romanized as Zheri-mi. The family names of the Yeri-mi clan are:

Geography 

It is bounded on the west by Zeliangrong villages, on the north by Jakhama, on the east by Kidima, on the south-east by Pudunamei (Manipur) and on the south by Khuzama.

Topography 
The Jakhama boundary on the north is marked by a river known as Kerho–l and on the south, the Khuzama boundary is marked by another river known as Chokhwi–l or Kezo–l. Both the river flows in parallel direction to meet at the Dzü-ü river which later flows into the biggest river in Nagaland—the Doyang in Wokha District.

Its summit can be reached easily by the Khiyo–ke route.

On the western side is the Dzüko Valley which includes a range of hillocks, the valley is drained by the Dzüko River which flows in a westerly direction forming the present day inter-state boundary between Nagaland and Manipur. On its west side, the Dzüko valley is flanked by the thick wooded Kezol–tsa Forest which has diverse species of flora and fauna.

Climate 
Viswema has warm summers and cool dry winters. Snow falls occasionally on higher altitudes.

Wards 
Viswema comprises two wards:
 Swe–ba ward
 Tepul ward

Demographics 
Viswema is located in Jakhama sub-division of Kohima district, Nagaland with total 1369 families residing. It has a population of 7417 of which 3576 are males while 3841 are females as per Population Census 2011.

In Viswema the Average Sex Ratio is 1074 which is higher than Nagaland state average of 931. Child Sex Ratio for the Viswema as per census is 1076, higher than Nagaland average of 943.

Religion 

Christianity is the dominant religion in Viswema, practised by almost 99% of its population with very few individuals from Kirhazou-mi and Pavo-mi Clans still practicing Pfütsana, the indigenous folk religion. Baptist, Christian Revival and Roman Catholic makes up the Christian population.

Economy 
In Viswema, most people were engaged in the civil service which serves as the main source of its economy. , 62% of the people were engaged in civil service, 4% were involved in private sector and 34% 
of the people were engaged in agriculture. A large number of Government and Private employees commute to and fro to their workplaces in Kohima daily.

Culture and attractions

Festivals 
Apart from the major religious festivals like Christmas, Easter, etc. the village also celebrates several local festivals.
 Te–l Khukhu
 
Te–l Khukhu is a festival that falls on the 13th of Chünyi (July). It is a time of giving and sharing of food with each other. This is the only festival dedicated for girls. Come July and the young damsels are abuzz with preparations for the Te–l Khukhu festival. They start collecting wild flowers in advance to decorate the particular Chokrwu (eaves at the entrance of a house) they decide on. The most common flowers are Khwüso Pü (Ginger lily, Hedychium aurantiacum wall), Phakü Pü (Rock butterfly lily, Hedychium ellepticum Buch), Terü su and Tsakoshe Pitha Nü (Tender Maize). Gone were the days when different animistic rituals were performed but with the advent of Christianity the rituals were no longer performed. Today it is celebrated as a time of get-togetherness and sharing the little you have with your dear and near ones.

Places of interest 
 Dzüko Valley

The main entry to Dzüko Valley is from Viswema where one can travel to the rest house above Teyozwü by a Tata Sumo taxi. From here one has to climb forty minutes to the top of the mountain. This is where Dzüko starts but the main valley is still another two hours walk away.

 Mount Tempü

This is the highest peak in Viswema situated at an altitude of 2994m above sea level. The best time to visit this peak is during the snow covered winter months.

 Teyozwü

This is a hill located between Viswema and the Dzüko valley.

 Hope Garden
This is a garden located above Viswema on the way to Dzüko valley. It is also a part family burial ground of a Yeri–mi clan.

 Latakhrü Park
Latakhrü Park is located at Krayo which provides a resting shed to travelers and also farmers on the route.

Cuisines 
 Zawo 

Zawo or commonly known as Galho among the Angamis is also a popular dish in Viswema.  It is a mix dish made of rice, vegetables and various meats.

 Mesü
Mesü is pork or beef cooked with its blood. It is a common cuisine among the Tenyimis but the Mesü of Viswema is considered to be the best.

Film 
Some portion of the 2005 film Were I the Moon? The Legend of Sopfünuo was filmed in Viswema.

Education 
Viswema has a higher literacy rate compared to Nagaland. In 2011, the literacy rate of Viswema was 80.69% compared to 79.55% of Nagaland. In Viswema Male literacy stands at 86.91% while female literacy rate was 74.89%.

Educational Institutions in Viswema:
John Government Higher Secondary School
St. Joseph's Higher Secondary School
Viswema Baptist School

The St. Joseph's College, Jakhama is located about two km from Viswema.

Government and politics

Government 
Viswema is headed by the chairman of the Viswema Village Council. The council does not only represent the citizens of Viswema but every citizens of Viswe–mi residing in and outside Viswema. The council is responsible for customary practices, public safety, welfare services, etc. The chairman and council members are elected to five-year term. The term for the chairman and council members lasts five years and only has a one term limit.

Politics 
Viswema falls under the Southern Angami II constituency, of the Nagaland Legislative Assembly.

Notable Political Leaders
 Vizol Angami (1914–2008), Chief Minister of Nagaland (1974–1975; 1977–1980).
 Vizadel Sakhrie (1943–1995), former Minister of the Nagaland Legislative Assembly.
 Zale Neikha (born 1976), present Member of Legislative Assembly from Southern Angami II constituency.
 Viswesül Pusa (1954–2017), Member of Legislative Assembly from 1993 to 2013.
 Zaku Zachariah Tsükrü (1947–2017), former Vice President of the Naga People's Front
 Kropol Vitsü (born 1964), former Member of Legislative Assembly from Southern Angami II constituency.

Sports

Football 
Viswema is known for its football club Viswemi FC.

Traditional sports 
 Kene

Kene, the folk wrestling style and traditional sport of the Nagas is also a popular local sport in Viswema. Viswema biennially sends its wrestling title-holder to participate in the Naga Wrestling Championship.

 Pcheda

Pcheda is a traditional game that requires players to throw thin bamboo sticks from a set distance. An open competition is held annually in the month of January.

Transportation

Airports 
The airport serves domestic flights to and from the country.

Both the airports are linked to Viswema by the Asian Highway 1 and 2.

The Kohima Chiethu Airport is currently under construction. Once completed it will serve as the nearest airport to Viswema.

Roadways

Highways passing through Viswema 
  Asian Highway 1: Tokyo – Viswema – Istanbul
  Asian Highway 2: Denpasar – Viswema – Khosravi
 : Dibrugarh (Assam) – Viswema – Tuipang (Mizoram)

Viswema is well connected by road with the AH1 and AH2 and also the NH-2 and the state highway connecting it with the various parts of Kohima District and also the neighboring Phek District through Viswema. Taxis from Kohima to Viswema are also available.

Rail 
The Chümoukedima Shokhuvi Railway Station and the Dimapur Railway Station serves as the nearest railway stations to Viswema. The currently under-construction Kohima Zubza Railway Station on the Dhansiri–Zubza line once completed will serve as the nearest railway station from Viswema.

Notable personalities 
Throughout its history, a sizeable number of people of Viswema descent have become notable in many varied fields. Among its notable personalities are prominent figures in the state such as:
 Holshe Khrie-o, Nagaland State Sepaktakraw coach
 Viseyie Koso, The first Naga sportsman to represent India at an Asian Games (2010 Asian Games held in Guangzhou, Guangdong, China)
 Vizol Koso, The fourth Chief Minister of Nagaland and also the first Naga pilot (Royal Indian Air Force during World War II)
 Zale Neikha, Member of Nagaland Legislative Assembly from 2018 to 2023 from the Nationalist Democratic Progressive Party
 Viswesül Pusa, Member of Nagaland Legislative Assembly from 1993 to 2013 from the Indian National Congress Party
 Tseilhoutuo Rhütso, Present Member of Nagaland Legislative Assembly from Kohima Town Assembly constituency from the National People's Party
 Vizadel Sakhrie, The first Naga Medical Specialist
 Hovithal Sothü, Project Director at TAFMA
 Kropol Vitsü, Present Member of Nagaland Legislative Assembly from the Bharatiya Janata Party

See also 

 Angami Naga
 Chakhesang Naga
 Index of Viswema-related articles
 Naga people

Notes and references

Notes

References

External links 

 
Villages in Kohima district